Dundee Castle was a castle in Dundee, Scotland, destroyed by Robert the Bruce in 1313.

Dundee was created a royal burgh by King William the Lion in the 13th century. The castle was surrendered to the English in 1296.  William Wallace laid siege to Dundee Castle in 1297 and the garrison surrendered, before the Battle of Stirling Bridge. The castle was captured again by the English in 1300 and again in 1303 and 1310. King Edward I of England visited the castle in 1300 and 1303 and made repairs to it. Edward de Brus captured the castle held by Constable William de Montfichet in 1312/13 and destroyed it. St. Paul's Cathedral was later built on its site.

References

Castles in Dundee
Demolished buildings and structures in Scotland
Former castles in Scotland
History of Dundee